Bhubanananda Odisha School of Engineering (BOSE) -aka- ଭୁବନାନନ୍ଦ ଓଡିଶା ଯାନ୍ତ୍ରିକ ବିଦ୍ୟାଳୟ, କଟକ, is the oldest diploma engineering school in Odisha located in Cuttack, Odisha, India.

Founded in 1923 as Orissa School of Engineering. It initially offered civil engineering; mechanical engineering and electrical engineering were introduced later. It currently offers a three-year diploma in engineering in eight disciplines.

History
The Cuttack Survey School 1876 - (Later renamed to Orissa School of Engineering) was established as the first technical school in the state. The conversation of School of Engineering happened in 1923. This is the oldest technical institute in the state.

Prior to 1923, there was no scope of technical education in Orissa. Students were going to Bihar School of Engineering for Diploma courses. On elevation of Bihar School of Engineering to Bihar Engineering College, Orissa School of Engineering was established in 1923 at Cuttack under Bihar-Orissa Government.

After World War II in 1939 and during Japanese aggression in 1942, Orissa School of Engineering trained more than 1000 war technicians, demobilized soldiers, and industrial trainees. The institute was centre of war efforts in the Eastern Region. Lord Wavell, the then Viceroy of India was paying hurricane visits to the institution during the thick of war. Initially technician courses in civil engineering, electrical-mechanical engineering were offered. At a later stage, to meet the industrial demand, diversified courses were introduced under the semester system in 1971.

Courses
The institute currently offers three year diploma/polytechnic courses in eight disciplines:

 Civil engineering
 Electrical engineering
 Mechanical engineering
 Electronics & telecommunication engineering
 Automobile engineering
 Computer science and engineering
 Information technology 
 Applied electronics and instrumentation engineering

The institute also has a Mathematics and Science Department which provides courses for 1st year students along with advanced mathematics courses for other departments.
Campus Layout: Spread over 44 acre of area near River Mahanadi which covers the main Institution,  Separate Boys and Girls Hostel ad Staff Quarters. It has a lush green Play ground which is maintained by Union Sporting Club. This campus also shared by Biju Pattnaik Film and TV Institute of Orissa BPFTIO, a  TV and film institute in Eastern India.

Library
The library is one of the oldest libraries in the state and has a good collection of both text and reference books for use by the students and faculties. The main library covers a space of 725 sqm. The students avail library facility from both main library and book bank for their study purposes.
Total no. of books available – 36,057
Total no. Of journals/ periodicals – 28
Reading room – 1600 sqft.
Stock room – 3400 sqft.
Seating capacity of students – 80
Library automation / computerisation is in progress

Hostel
There is one male hostel where 440 students stay. It is sufficient to provide hostel facilities to all male students.

There is a 15% reservation of seats for women candidates in engineering schools and polytechnics of the state. Therefore, at present there are 229 women students reading in this institute. The intake capacity of ladies hostel is only 60 as against which 130 women students are staying in the hostel. Another women's hostel of 100 seated capacity is almost complete and ready from this year.

Computer Center and Internet

The institution has four computer centers with about 100 computers. It has 4 Mbit/s leased internet connectivity and is shortly going to have Wifi setup for a wireless campus network.

References

Engineering colleges in Odisha
Science and technology in Bhubaneswar
Education in Cuttack
Educational institutions established in 1923
1923 establishments in India